James Gatehouse (27 March 1883 – 7 December 1949) was an Australian rules footballer who played with Geelong in the Victorian Football League (VFL).

In 1900 he married Eleanor Wright Austin, who was commonly referred to as 'Nellie'. She was a successful golfer and golf administrator and won three Australian titles, five Victorian titles and ten Club Championships at Royal Melbourne Golf Club. Her first Australian title was won in 1909.

James Gatehouse's father was Mayor of Melbourne during the period 1874–1875.

Notes

External links 

1883 births
1949 deaths
Australian rules footballers from Melbourne
Geelong Football Club players
People educated at Geelong College